Charity Hospital may refer to:

 Charity Hospital (New Orleans)
 Charity Hospital (Savannah, Georgia), listed on the National Register of Historic Places in Georgia
 City Hospital (Roosevelt Island, New York), formerly known as Charity Hospital
:Category:Charitable hospitals

See also
 Hospital de la Caridad (disambiguation), the literal translation of Charity Hospital into Spanish